La llama de tu amor is a Mexican telenovela produced by Guillermo Diazayas for Televisa in 1979.

Cast 
Carlos Piñar - Santiago
Ana Martín - Ana Cecilia
Norma Lazareno 
July Furlong
Socorro Avelar
Rolando de Castro 
Alicia Montoya
Rosa Furman
Rafael Banquells
Luis Rizo

References

External links 

Mexican telenovelas
1979 telenovelas
Televisa telenovelas
Spanish-language telenovelas
1979 Mexican television series debuts
1979 Mexican television series endings